George Walker (December 24, 1772 – February 8, 1847) was an English gothic novelist and publisher.

Life

He was born in Falcon Square, Cripplegate, London, England.  He worked as a bookseller and music publisher, into which business his son George (1803–1879) also entered. His writings were anti-reform, reacting to writers such as William Godwin and Thomas Holcroft.

He died on the 8th February 1847 and was buried on the western side of Highgate Cemetery.

The Vagabond (1799)
Walker's anti-Jacobin novel The Vagabond: A Novel (1799) anachronistically sets the Gordon Riots of 1780 amidst the political events of the late 1790s. After attending a lecture by "Citizen Ego", a character based on John Thelwall, its narrator unwittingly becomes a prominent figure in the riots. Inverting radical accounts of the significance of the riots, The Vagabond presents them as solely destructive and acquisitive. Later, the hero's mentor Stupeo, based on William Godwin, attempts to establish a pantisocratic community in the American wilderness, but is captured and burned at the stake by Native Americans.

In the novel's dedication, Walker describes the novel as "an attempt to parry the Enemy with their own weapons" and to undermine radicalism's political romance". The literary critic Ian Haywood reads The Vagabond as evidence that the Gordon Riots "still exerted a powerful hold on popular memory" at the time of its publication.

Books 
 The Romance of the Cavern, 1792
 The Haunted Castle, 1794
 The House of Tinian, 1795
 Theodore Cyphon, or The Benevolent Jew, 1796
 Cynthelia, or a Woman of Ten Thousand, 1797
 The Vagabond, 1799
 The Three Spaniards, 1800
 Poems on Various Subjects, 1801
 Don Raphael, 1803
 Two Girls of Eighteen, 1806
 The Travels of Sylvester Tramper in Africa, 1813
 The Adventures of Timothy Thoughtless, 1813 (for children)
 The Battle of Waterloo, A Poem, 1815

References 

 

1772 births
1847 deaths
Burials at Highgate Cemetery
18th-century English novelists
19th-century English novelists
English male novelists
19th-century English male writers
18th-century English male writers